Red Hill Pass (el. 9,993  ft. ) is a high mountain pass in the Rocky Mountains of central Colorado in the United States.

The pass is located in the foothills of the Mosquito Range at the northern end of South Park in Park County. Though unlabeled at the summit, it is identified by signs from both directions at the bottom. True to its name, red hills flank both sides of the summit and the inclines, especially on the south side. It is traversed by U.S. Highway 285 approximately 6 mi (10 km) northeast of the town of Fairplay,  The pass is easily traversable by most motor vehicles and rarely closes in the winter.

See also
Kenosha Pass

References

Mountain passes of Colorado
Landforms of Park County, Colorado
Transportation in Park County, Colorado